Charles Armstrong was a 55 year old labourer from Crossmaglen who disappeared on 16 August 1981. It is suspected that he was abducted and killed by the Provisional IRA, a victim of enforced disappearance. No reason, in this case, has ever been publicly given. Armstrong and his wife Kathleen had five children. Armstrong's body was retrieved in 2010 and his funeral took place on 18 September 2010.

Disappearance
On the day Armstrong disappeared, his wife walked with their daughters to Mass, where they had planned to meet him after he drove a friend to it. He did not appear and it was only when they got home that they discovered that he had not met their friend. Initially, it was thought that he had had an accident, so his family and friends searched the area, but there was no sign of him. The next day, a friend phoned the family to tell them that his car had been found outside a cinema in Dundalk.

His name did not appear on a list of nine people whose disappearances the Provisional IRA admitted responsibility for in 1999. Gerry Adams, president of Sinn Féin, denied that the IRA was responsible, but journalist Suzanne Breen claimed that she had been contacted by a member of the IRA who said that the IRA was responsible.

Searches
In 2001, a search for his body produced no results. In July 2010, a group searching for Armstrong announced that they had found human remains in County Monaghan. The Independent Commission for the Location of Victims' Remains said that it had found the remains early on the afternoon of 29 July 2010 in the townland of Aughrim More, on the County Monaghan side of Cullaville. 
This search was carried out after the Commission had received anonymously a map indicating an area which had not been searched before for Armstrong's body. In September 2010, the Independent Commission confirmed that the remains found were those of Charles Armstrong.

See also
Disappeared (Northern Ireland)
Independent Commission for the Location of Victims' Remains
List of solved missing persons cases
Thomas Murphy (Irish republican)
Gerard Evans
Columba McVeigh
Murder of Jean McConville
Disappearance of Peter Wilson
Robert Nairac
Murder of Gareth O'Connor
Internal Security Unit

References

External links
"Looking for Charlie", guardian.co.uk
Charley Armstrong, thedisappearedni.co.uk

1920s births
1980s missing person cases
1981 deaths
1981 murders in the United Kingdom
Deaths by firearm in Northern Ireland
Enforced disappearances in Northern Ireland
Kidnapped people from Northern Ireland
Missing person cases in Northern Ireland
Murder victims from Northern Ireland
People declared dead in absentia
People from Crossmaglen
People murdered in Northern Ireland
Terrorism deaths in Northern Ireland
The Troubles in County Armagh
1980s murders in Northern Ireland